The Associazione di Ingegneria Offshore e Marina (AIOM) is an Italian non-profit association that seeks to further the knowledge and study of marine engineering. The association was founded in Milan in 1982 to create a forum for scientists and engineers involved in maritime professional activities. AIOM organizes congresses, conferences, seminars and other events to promote the continuing education and advancement of industry professionals. The organization has cooperated with several national and international bodies during its activities (e.g.ASME, IALCCE) and celebrated its 30th anniversary in 2012.

Organization
AIOM's main body is the assembly of members that operate through a Directorate and a President. AIOM has several Operative Centers, located in Italian universities.

Operative Units
AIOM has the following Operational Centers (Sedi Operative AIOM): 
Sede Operativa AIOM di Bologna
Sede Operativa AIOM della Campania
Sede Operativa AIOM di Genova
Sede Operativa AIOM di Palermo
Sede Operativa AIOM di Reggio Calabria
Sede Operativa AIOM del Salento
Sede Operativa AIOM di Ancona

Bulletins
AIOM publishes bulletins reporting technical articles of scientists and technicians involved with maritime and off-shore engineering.

Giornate AIOM and Studi di Aggiornamento sull'Ingegneria Off-Shore e Marina
AIOM organizes regular congresses and events. "Giornate AIOM" were useful meetings for experts and technicians involved in these fields. AIOM organizes regularly follow-up studies on maritime and off-shore engineering. The last editions were:
Studi di aggiornamento AIOM 2011 - Università di Lecce
Studi di aggiornamento AIOM 2012 - Università di Reggio Calabria
Studi di aggiornamento AIOM 2013 - Università di Bologna
Studi di aggiornamento AIOM 2014 - Università di Palermo

Plaque to careers
In 2012 AIOM began recognizing regularly "AIOM Plaques" to award distinguished personalities in fields of interest.

Award for university degree thesis
In 2014, AIOM initiated an annual award to recognize the excellency of a university degree thesis in the marine and offshore engineering field.

References

External links
 AIOM (Official Website)

Marine engineering organizations
Offshore engineering
Coastal engineering
Professional associations based in Italy